Bronowice ((German Braunsdorf, Sorbian Brunojce) is a village in the administrative district of Gmina Trzebiel, within Żary County, Lubusz Voivodeship, in western Poland, close to the German border.

In the 1880s, most inhabitants spoke Sorbian.

The village has a population of 370.

See also
 Territorial changes of Poland after World War II

References

Villages in Żary County